Mirror Hall is an oil on canvas painting by Iranian realist painter Kamal-ol-Molk, his first work since receiving the title Kamal-ol-Molk ("Perfection of the Realm"). It is considered one of his masterpieces, and marks a starting point in Iran's modern art.

The painting was executed in over five years, depicting Qajar ruler Naser-ed-Din Shah sitting on a chair in front of a window at the Mirror Hall of the Golestan Palace, where the Qajar dynasty resided.

The completion of the painting coincided with the Qajar ruler's murder in 1896, and the rise of Mozaffar-ed-Din Shah, the fifth Qajar ruler.

Kamal-ol-Molk was later questioned about the theft of some precious gems located at the hall, but the actual culprit was eventually found.

The Mirror Hall is famous for its remarkable mirror work. It was designed by architect Abd-ol-Hosein (Sani-ol-Molk), while Minister of Architecture Yahya Khan (Mowtamed-ol-Molk) was the consultant.

References

See also
 The Doshan Tappeh Street, another work by Kamal-ol-Molk.

Paintings by Kamal-ol-molk
1896 paintings
Modern paintings
Paintings in Iran